Pavel Vasilyevich Kirylchyk (born 4 January 1981) is a Belarusian football coach and former player (midfielder).

Honours
Gomel
Belarusian Super Cup winner: 2012

External links

Stats on Odessa Football website  

1982 births
Living people
Footballers from Minsk
Belarusian footballers
Association football midfielders
Belarus international footballers
Belarusian expatriate footballers
Expatriate footballers in Ukraine
Belarusian expatriate sportspeople in Ukraine
Expatriate footballers in Russia
Expatriate footballers in Kazakhstan
Ukrainian Premier League players
FC Torpedo Minsk players
FC Neftekhimik Nizhnekamsk players
FC Kryvbas Kryvyi Rih players
FC Chornomorets Odesa players
FC Karpaty Lviv players
FC Mariupol players
FC Minsk players
FC Kairat players
FC Gomel players
FC Granit Mikashevichi players
FC Isloch Minsk Raion players
FC Dnepr Mogilev players
FC Arsenal Dzerzhinsk players
Belarusian football managers
FC Arsenal Dzerzhinsk managers